Macotasa biplagella is a moth of the family Erebidae. It is found on Borneo.

References

Lithosiina
Moths described in 1877